John Gosling may refer to:

John Gosling, musician in the Kinks 
John Gosling (Psychic TV musician) (born 1963), British big beat and industrial musician
John Gosling (cricketer, born 1833) (1833–1882), English cricketer 
John Gosling (cricketer, born 1921) (1921–1994), Fijian cricketer
John A. Gosling (1928–2004), conductor of classical music
John T. Gosling, American physicist